Gustavo Macías Zambrano (born 26 August 1969) is a Mexican politician affiliated with the National Action Party. As of 2014 he served as Deputy of the LX Legislature of the Mexican Congress representing Jalisco.

References

1969 births
Living people
Politicians from Jalisco
Members of the Chamber of Deputies (Mexico)
National Action Party (Mexico) politicians
21st-century Mexican politicians